Popielarze may refer to the following places:
Popielarze, Gniezno County in Greater Poland Voivodeship (west-central Poland)
Popielarze, Piaseczno County in Masovian Voivodeship (east-central Poland)
Popielarze, Wołomin County in Masovian Voivodeship (east-central Poland)
Popielarze, Turek County in Greater Poland Voivodeship (west-central Poland)